An Yi-xuan (born 吳玟靜 on 29 September 1980), also known as Ady An, is a Taiwanese actress and singer who was discovered when she was working in a coffee shop. Born on September 29, 1980, she also is known as Audrey An and Wu Wen Ching. Ady An debuted as an actress in the 2001 television drama “Marmalade Boy” but gained fame after her performance in “The Outsiders” in 2004. She then focused on breaking into Mainland China and has since appeared in many popular dramas in both China and Taiwan, including “Autumn’s Concerto,” which holds the record for one of the highest average viewerships in Taiwan. Her cousin is actress Wan Wei Qiao.

On March 15, 2017, it was announced that Ady An married businessman Levo Chen (Chen Rong Lian).
On July 18, 2019 Ady An gave birth to a son.

Career

Ady An debuted in 2000, filming the drama Mala Xianshi. She rose to fame in 2004 after starring in the youth idol drama The Outsiders opposite Dylan Kuo, after which she chose to develop her acting career in mainland China. The same year, she starred in Chinese Paladin, an adaptation of the action RPG The Legend of Sword and Fairy, which increased her recognition in China.

Since then, she had played many roles in both Chinese and Taiwanese television dramas, such as The Legend of Hero (2005), The Great Revival (2006), Fox Volant of the Snowy Mountain (2006). In 2006, she starred in Fast Track Love, the first race-car series in mainland China.

In 2008, she starred in the republican drama Yun Niang alongside Feng Shaofeng and Leanne Liu, which achieved #1 in ratings upon its premiere on SMG.

The following year, she signed with Huayi Brothers, and was chosen to play the role of  Zhao Min in the television series The Heaven Sword and Dragon Saber, an adaptation of the novel of the same title by Louis Cha. In the same year, An also returned to Taiwanese screens, starring as Liang Mucheng alongside Vanness Wu in Autumn's Concerto, which became the second highest rated Taiwanese idol television drama to date.

In 2011, An was paired up with Du Chun in Fight and Love with a Terracotta Warrior, a television series set in three different eras. An also played Li Shishi, a prostitute and mistress of Emperor Huizong of Song, in All Men Are Brothers, an adaptation of the classical novel Water Margin.

In 2012, she reunited with Chinese Paladin co-star Hu Ge in nano-movie Refresh 3+7.

An returned to her idol drama roots in 2014, starring alongside Mike He in Go, Single Lady.

Personal life
An rarely talks about her family, but has revealed to Apple Daily that she was raised in a single-parent family. She expressed that she did not have a happy childhood. Her parents divorced when she was four, and both her parents remarried. She and her mother stopped seeing each other when she was still young, and she was raised in a strict manner by her father and stepmother. An's family is very wealthy.

An has a group of close celebrity friends collectively known as An Corporation. It includes 6 other Taiwanese stars Joe Chen, Shone An, Esther Liu, Bianca Bai, Linda Liao and Kimi Hsia.

On March 15, 2017, it was announced that An married Macau businessman Levo Chen, whom she met in late 2014. They have two children; a son who they nicknamed "66" and a daughter who they nicknamed "Wa-bao".

Filmography

Film

Television

Music video

Discography

Studio albums

Published works

Awards and nominations

References

External links

Ady An Yi Xuan's profile - spcnet.tv
Personal Blog

1980 births
Living people
Taiwanese television actresses
21st-century Taiwanese actresses
Taiwanese film actresses
Actresses from Taipei
Musicians from Taipei
Taiwanese idols
21st-century Taiwanese singers
21st-century Taiwanese women singers